The Tennessee and Alabama Railroad Freight Depot was a historic property dating from c.1858 in Franklin, Tennessee that was evaluated for its historic merit and deemed eligible for listing in the National Register of Historic Places in 2000.  It was not however listed due to owner objection.  It has also been known as the Louisville and Nashville Railroad Freight Depot.  Its NRHP reference number for the evaluation was 00000231.

The depot included Italianate architecture.  The property's NRHP eligibility is addressed in a 1988 study of Williamson County historical resources.

References

Buildings and structures in Williamson County, Tennessee
Italianate architecture in Tennessee
Railway stations in the United States opened in 1858
National Register of Historic Places in Williamson County, Tennessee